Stefan Thanei  (born 3 September 1981) is an Italian freestyle skier.

He competed in the 2013, 2015 and 2017 FIS Freestyle World Ski Championships, and in the 2018 Winter Olympics.

References

External links

1981 births
Living people
Italian male alpine skiers
Italian male freestyle skiers
Olympic freestyle skiers of Italy 
Freestyle skiers at the 2018 Winter Olympics
People from Schlanders
Sportspeople from Südtirol
21st-century Italian people